The 1972 South Dakota Coyotes football team was an American football team that represented the University of South Dakota in the North Central Conference (NCC) during the 1972 NCAA College Division football season. In its seventh season under head coach Joe Salem, the team compiled a 9–1 record (6–1 against NCC opponents), tied for the NCC championship, and outscored opponents by a total of 296 to 144. The team played its home games at Inman Field in Vermillion, South Dakota.

Schedule

References

South Dakota
South Dakota Coyotes football seasons
North Central Conference football champion seasons
South Dakota Coyotes football